Mbuji Mayi Airport  is an airport serving Mbuji Mayi (formerly Bakwanga), the capital of the Kasai-Oriental Province in the Democratic Republic of the Congo.

Facilities

The Mbuji Mayi VOR/DME (Ident: MBY) is located on the field.

Airlines and destinations

Accidents and incidents
On August 19, 2015, a Brussels Airlines Boeing 737, operating for Korongo Airlines, sustained damage to its horizontal stabilizer upon landing at Mbuji Mayi Airport due to bad pavement conditions
On December 24, 2015, a Services Air Cargo Airbus A310 was unable to stop on the runway due to poor pavement conditions and wet runway surface, and exited the runway. A total of 8 people were killed and 9 injured, all on the ground.

See also
Transport in the Democratic Republic of the Congo
List of airports in the Democratic Republic of the Congo

References

External links
OpenStreetMap - Mbuji Mayi
OurAirports - Mbuji Mayi
Google Maps - Mbuji Mayi
FallingRain - Mbuji Mayi Airport

Airports in Kasaï-Oriental
Mbuji-Mayi